Hlynur Birgisson (born 22 January 1968) is a retired Icelandic football defender.

References

1968 births
Living people
Hlynur Birgisson
Þór Akureyri players
Örebro SK players
Allsvenskan players
Association football defenders
Hlynur Birgisson
Expatriate footballers in Sweden
Hlynur Birgisson
Hlynur Birgisson